William Glascock (May 28, 1730 –  served as Chairman of the Executive Council (governor) of Georgia during the American Revolution. He was from Augusta and was a veteran of the French and Indian War, Seminole Wars and the War of 1812. Glascock subsequently served in the Georgia General Assembly and the U.S. Congress. He was the father of Brigadier General Thomas Glascock Sr., and grandfather of Brigadier General Thomas Glascock Jr.

Early life
Glascock was born on May 28, 1730, in North Farnham Parish, Richmond County, Virginia, to Gregory and Alice (Elder) Glascock. He became a lawyer and moved to Augusta, Georgia. William had two children, Thomas, who married Mary Bacon, and Blanche, who married Captain Robert Walton.

Political life
In Augusta, he became involved in politics, serving as a representative in the Georgia House of Representatives. During the Revolutionary War, he was Speaker of the House. Glascock was labeled as a "Rebel Counselor" in the Disqualifying Act of 1780. This act was passed by Royal Governor James Wright and the King's Council who were angered by the continued patriot opposition to British rule in Georgia after the capture of Savannah in 1778. This act has become for Georgia an honor roll of its heroes of the Revolution.

In 1779, Glascock served as acting governor and helped establish the new state of Georgia government. In 1782, he was seated on the bench, having been appointed Justice for the Court of Richmond County. In 1783, he was appointed Commissioner of Indian Affairs for the State of Georgia.

On May 18, 1791, he hosted President George Washington at his home.

Death and legacy
William Glascock died prior to December 23, 1793, the date on which his will was probated. He is buried in Magnolia Cemetery in Augusta, Georgia along with his second wife, Elizabeth, and a grandson. There is no known portrait of William Glascock.

See also
List of speakers of the Georgia House of Representatives

References

External links

Governors of Georgia (U.S. state)
People of Georgia (U.S. state) in the American Revolution
1730 births
1793 deaths
Independent state governors of the United States
Georgia (U.S. state) Independents
People from Farnham, Virginia
Speakers of the Georgia House of Representatives